Dampvitoux is a commune in the Meurthe-et-Moselle department in north-eastern France.

History
The village was part of the Three Bishoprics, in the diocese of Metz. A church was built in 1790. The village was damaged during the First World War.

See also
Communes of the Meurthe-et-Moselle department
Lorraine Regional Natural Park

References

Communes of Meurthe-et-Moselle